Y7 may refer to:

 Xian Y-7, a Chinese-built version of the Antonov An-24 aircraft
 LNER Class Y7, a British class of steam locomotives designed for shunting
 A television channel unsuitable for children aged under seven, in the U.S. TV Parental Guidelines
 Silverjet, IATA code Y7

See also
7Y (disambiguation)